This is a list of the Japanese species of the superfamilies Choreutoidea, Schreckensteinioidea, Epermenioidea, Alucitoidea, Pterophoroidea, Immoidea, Hyblaeoidea, Copromorphoidea and Thyridoidea. It also acts as an index to the species articles and forms part of the full List of moths of Japan.

Choreutidae
 イラクサハマキモドキ — Anthophila fabriciana (Linnaeus, 1767)
 アコウハマキモドキ — Choreutis achyrodes (Meyrick, 1912)
 和名未定 — Choreutis amethystodes (Meyrick, 1914)
 ニレハマキモドキ — Choreutis atrosignata (Christoph, 1888)
 オオキオビハマキモドキ — Choreutis basalis (Felder & Rogenhofer, 1875)
 ハスオビハマキモドキ — Choreutis cunuligera (Diakonoff, 1978)
 和名未定 — Choreutis cyanogramma (Diakonoff & Arita, 1979)
 ダイアナハマキモドキ — Choreutis diana (Hübner, [1822])
 ハガタオビハマキモドキ — Choreutis fulminea (Meyrick, 1912)
 コウゾハマキモドキ — Choreutis hyligenes (Butler, 1879)
 イヌビワハマキモドキ — Choreutis japonica (Zeller, 1877)
 チビハマキモドキ — Choreutis minuta (Diakonoff & Arita, 1979)
 ガジュマルハマキモドキ — Choreutis ophiosema (Lower, 1896)
 ニセリンゴハマキモドキ — Choreutis pariana (Clerck, [1764])
 リンゴハマキモドキ — Choreutis vinosa discolor (Diakonoff & Arita, 1979)
 キオビハマキモドキ — Choreutis xanthogramma (Meyrick, 1912)
 ヤナギイチゴハマキモドキ — Choreutis yakushimensis (Marumo, 1923)
 ミヤマハマキモドキ — Prochoreutis alpina (Arita, 1976)
 和名未定 — Prochoreutis brunescens (Diakonoff, 1978)
 アトギンボシハマキモドキ — Prochoreutis delicata (Arita, 1976)
 コアトギンボシハマキモドキ — Prochoreutis diakonoffi Arita, 1985
 ニセアトギンボシハマキモドキ — Prochoreutis hadrogastra (Diakonoff, 1978)
 クロコギンボシハマキモドキ — Prochoreutis kurokoi Arita, 1987
 シロヘリハマキモドキ — Prochoreutis myllerana (Fabricius, 1794)
 アトシロスジハマキモドキ — Prochoreutis sehestediana (Fabricius, 1776)
 シロオビハマキモドキ — Prochoreutis solaris (Erschoff, 1877)
 イワテギンボシハマキモドキ — Prochoreutis subdelicata Arita, 1987
 ギンスジハマキモドキ — Prochoreutis ultimana (Krulikowsky, 1909)
 ギンボシハマキモドキ — Tebenna bjerkandrella (Thunberg, 1784)
 ゴボウハマキモドキ — Tebenna micalis (Mann, 1857)
 ヤマハハコハマキモドキ — Tebenna submicalis Danilevsky, 1969
 和名未定 — Tebenna yamashitai Arita, 1987
 ミドリオオハマキモドキ — Saptha beryllitis (Meyrick, 1910)
 イヌビワオオハマキモドキ — Saptha divitiosa Walker, 1864
 オドリハマキモドキ — Litobrenthia japonica (Issiki, 1930)
 タイワンオドリハマキモドキ — Brenthia formosensis Issiki, 1930
 モリウチオドリハマキモドキ — Brenthia moriutii Arita, 1987
 コミヤマミズオドリハマキモドキ — Brenthia pileae Arita, 1971
 ヤエヤマオドリハマキモドキ — Brenthia yaeyamae Arita, 1971

Schreckensteiniidae
 タテジマホソマイコガ — Schreckensteinia festaliella (Hübner, [1819])

Epermeniidae
 ウスグロヒメササベリガ — Phaulernis chasanica Gaedike, 1993
 キモンクロササベリガ — Phaulernis fulviguttella (Zeller, 1839)
 トサカササベリガ — Phaulernis pulchra Gaedike, 1993
 チャマダラササベリガ — Epermenia fuscomaculata Kuroko & Gaedike, 2006
 シベチャササベリガ — Epermenia ijimai Kuroko & Gaedike, 2006
 トベラササベリガ — Epermenia muraseae Gaedike & Kuroko, 2000
 ニセチャマダラササベリガ — Epermenia pseudofuscomaculata Kuroko & Gaedike, 2006
 ウスチャオオササベリガ — Epermenia shimekii Kuroko & Gaedike, 2006
 シシウドササベリガ — Epermenia sinjovi Gaedike, 1993
 ハイイロオオササベリガ — Epermenia strictella (Wocke, 1867)
 シロオビササベリガ — Epermenia sugisimai Kuroko & Gaedike, 2006
 ヒメササベリガ — Epermenia thailandica Gaedike, 1987
 ニセトベラササベリガ — Epermenia uedai Kuroko & Gaedike, 2006

Alucitidae
 アヤニジュウシトリバ — Alucita flavofascia (Inoue, 1958)
 ヤマトニジュウシトリバ — Alucita japonica (Matsumura, 1931)
 和名未定 — Alucita pusilla Hashimoto, 1984
 ニジュウシトリバ — Alucita spilodesma (Meyrick, 1908)
 和名未定 — Alucita straminea Hashimoto, 1984

Pterophoridae
 ジャンボトリバ — Agdistopis sinhala (T. B. Fletcher, 1909)
 タカムクシロトリバ — Agdistis takamukui Nohira, 1919
 サツマイモトリバ — Ochyrotica yanoi Arenberger, 1988
 シラホシトリバ — Deuterocopus albipunctatus T. B. Fletcher, 1910
 タイワンシラホシトリバ — Deuterocopus socotranus Rebel, 1907
 ミカドトリバ — Tetraschalis mikado (Hori, 1933)
 アイノトリバ — Platyptilia ainonis Matsumura, 1931
 トビモントリバ — Platyptilia cretalis (Meyrick, 1908)
 エゾギクトリバ — Platyptilia farfarella (Zeller, 1867)
 ブドウオオトリバ — Platyptilia ignifera Meyrick, 1908
 和名未定 — Platyptilia isodactyla (Zeller, 1852)
 ミヤマトリバ — Platyptilia montana Yano, 1963
 オオミヤマトリバ — Platyptilia nemoralis (Zeller, 1841)
 ハネビロトリバ — Platyptilia profunda Yano, 1963
 チビトビモントリバ — Bipunctiphorus dissipata (Yano, 1963)
 和名未定 — Gillmeria melanoschista (T. B. Fletcher, 1940)
 カラフトトリバ — Gillmeria pallidactyla (Haworth, 1811)
 ハネナガトリバ — Gillmeria scutata (Yano, 1961)
 トキンソウトリバ — Stenoptilodes taprobanes (Felder & Rogenhofer, 1875)
 クロマダラトリバ — Asiaephorus longicucullus Gielis, 2000
 マエクロモンオオトリバ — Stenoptilia admiranda Yano, 1963
 クロモンオオトリバ — Stenoptilia albilimbata Yano, 1963
 和名未定 — Stenoptilia nolckeni (Tengström, 1870)
 和名未定 — Stenoptilia pinarodactyla (Erschoff, 1877)
 サイグサトリバ — Stenoptilia saigusai Yano, 1963
 キキョウトリバ — Stenoptilia zophodactyla (Duponchel, 1840)
 タイワンキマダラトリバ — Xyroptila oenophanes Meyrick, 1908
 イッシキブドウトリバ — Nippoptilia issikii Yano, 1961
 コブドウトリバ — Nippoptilia minor Hori, 1933
 ブドウトリバ — Nippoptilia vitis (Sasaki, 1913)
 和名未定 — Paraplatyptilia optata (Yano, 1963)
 ニホントリバ — Amblyptilia japonica (Yano, 1963)
 オダマキトリバ — Amblyptilia punctidactyla (Haworth, 1811)
 チョウセントリバ — Cnaemidophorus rhododactylus ([Denis & Schiffermüller], 1775)
 チャイロトリバ — Exelastis pumilio (Zeller, 1873)
 ナカノホソトリバ — Fuscoptilia emarginata (Snellen, 1884)
 ノアズキトリバ — Tomotilus saitoi Yano, 1961
 タツナミトリバ — Procapperia pelecyntes (Meyrick, 1908)
 ジョウザンチビトリバ — Capperia jozana Matsumura, 1931
 オホーツクトリバ — Oxyptilus chrysodactylus ([Denis & Schiffermüller], 1775)
 キンバネチビトリバ — Stenodacma pyrrhodes (Meyrick, 1889)
 モウセンゴケトリバ — Buckleria paludum (Zeller, 1841)
 和名未定 — Stangeia xerodes (Meyrick, 1886)
 フジマメトリバ — Sphenarches anisodactylus (Walker, 1864)
 シロフクロトリバ — Pselnophorus japonicus Marumo, 1923
 フキトリバ — Pselnophorus vilis (Butler, 1881)
 シロカマトリバ — Hellinsia albidactylus (Yano, 1963)
 カワハラカマトリバ — Hellinsia didactylites (Ström, 1783)
 ハイモンカマトリバ — Hellinsia distinctus (Herrich-Schäffer, 1855)
 エゾトリバ — Hellinsia gypsotes (Meyrick, 1937)
 イシヤマカマトリバ — Hellinsia ishiyamanus (Matsumura, 1931)
 クワヤマカマトリバ — Hellinsia kuwayamai (Matsumura, 1931)
 キスジカマトリバ — Hellinsia lacteolus (Yano, 1963)
 ヨモギトリバ — Hellinsia lienigianus (Zeller, 1852)
 クロカマトリバ — Hellinsia nigridactylus (Yano, 1961)
 カムイカマトリバ — Hellinsia osteodactylus (Zeller, 1841)
 イノウエカマトリバ — Hellinsia tephradactylus (Hübner, [1813])
 イワテカマトリバ — Oidaematophorus iwatensis (Matsumura, 1931)
 オオカマトリバ — Oidaematophorus lithodactylus (Treitschke, 1833)
 ヒルガオトリバ — Emmelina argoteles (Meyrick, 1922)
 ウスキヒメトリバ — Adaina microdactyla (Hübner, [1813])
 シロトリバ — Pterophorus albidus (Zeller, 1852)
 マシロトリバ — Pterophorus chionadelpha (Meyrick, 1930)

Immidae
 カザリニセハマキ — Moca monocosma (Diakonoff & Arita, 1979)

Hyblaeidae
 ヨツボシセセリモドキ — Hyblaea constellata Guenée, 1852
 ニホンセセリモドキ — Hyblaea fortissima Butler, 1881
 キオビセセリモドキ — Hyblaea puera (Cramer, 1777)

Carposinidae
 和名未定 — Bondia quaestrix Meyrick, 1935
 シロモンクロシンクイ — Commatarcha palaeosema Meyrick, 1935
 ニセシロモンクロシンクイ — Commatarcha vaga Diakonoff, 1989
 ウスキシンクイ — Alexotypa japonica (Walsingham, 1900)
 チャモンシンクイ — Peragrarchis syncolleta (Meyrick, 1928)
 シロズシンクイ — Metacosmesis laxeuta (Meyrick, 1906)
 和名未定 — Carposina nipponensis Walsingham, 1900
 モモシンクイガ — Carposina sasakii Matsumura, 1900
 コブシロシンクイ — Meridarchis excisa (Walsingham, 1900)
 和名未定 — Meridarchis japonica (Walsingham, 1900)
 オオモンシロシンクイ — Meridarchis jumboa Kawabe, 1980
 和名未定 — Meridarchis merga Diakonoff, 1989
 クロボシシロオオシンクイ — Heterogymna ochrogramma seriatopunctata Matsumura, 1931

Copromorphidae
 リュウキュウマルバシンクイガ — Copromorpha kijimuna Nasu, Saito & Komai, 2004

Thyrididae
 アカジママドガ — Striglina cancellata (Christoph, 1881)
 オオアカジママドガ — Striglina oceanica Inoue, 1982
 チビアカジママドガ — Striglina paravenia Inoue, 1982
 アミメマドガ — Striglina suzukii Matsumura, 1921
 ヒメアカジママドガ — Striglina venia Whalley, 1976
 ウンモンマドガ — Canaea ryukyuensis Inoue, 1965
 ヒメシロテンマドガ — Banisia myrsusalis elaralis (Walker, 1859)
 シロテンマドガ — Banisia owadai Inoue, 1976
 コシロテンマドガ — Banisia whalleyi Inoue, 1998
 マドガ — Thyris usitata Butler, 1879
 チビマダラマドガ — Rhodoneura erecta (Leech, 1889)
 ヒメマダラマドガ — Rhodoneura hyphaema (West, 1932)
 ウスマダラマドガ — Rhodoneura pallida (Butler, 1879)
 スギタニマドガ — Rhodoneura sugitanii Matsumura, 1921
 マダラマドガ — Rhodoneura vittula Guenée, 1877
 リュウキュウマダラマドガ — Pharambara splendida Butler, 1887
 タテスジマドガ — Hypolamprus ypsilon (Warren, 1899)
 クロマダラマドガ — Microbelia canidentalis (Swinhoe, 1906)
 チビマドガ — Microbelia intimalis (Moore, 1888)
 サザナミマドガ — Calindoea polygraphalis (Walker, [1866])
 ナカグロマドガ — Addaea polyphoralis (Walker, 1866)
 シロマダラマドガ — Picrostomastis marginepunctalis (Leech, 1889)
 ハスオビマドガ — Pyrinioides aurea Butler, 1881
 キイロマドガ — Pyrinioides sinuosa (Warren, 1896)
 ギンスジオオマドガ — Herdonia margarita Inoue, 1976

C